The 1967 Capital City 300 was a NASCAR Grand National Series event that was held on September 10, 1967, at Virginia State Fairgrounds (now Richmond Raceway) in Richmond, Virginia. Until the 2020 The Real Heroes 400, this was the last race to have a random draw for the pole position. 

The time of the race was two hours, thirty-six minutes, and ten seconds with the average speed being . The pole position spot was chosen by a random drawing; the rain that swept through the area had made the track far too muddy for qualifying sessions. Brooks drew the pole and the race was then started under green-yellow. The cars paced for 24 laps to help pack the clay; Richard Petty took over the lead on lap 25 to help bring about true racing.

Those 24 laps were the only laps that Earl Brooks would lead in his NASCAR Grand National career.

Background
In 1953, Richmond International Raceway began hosting the Grand National Series with Lee Petty winning that first race in Richmond.  The original track was paved in 1968.  In 1988, the track was re-designed into its present D-shaped configuration

The name for the raceway complex was "Strawberry Hill" until the Virginia State Fairgrounds site was bought out in 1999 and renamed the "Richmond International Raceway".

Race report
Richard Petty would defeat Dick Hutcherson after all the laps in the race were completed; which became the 71st win in his 200-win career as a Cup Series race. The other top ten finishers were: Paul Goldsmith, Sam McQuagg, James Hylton, Wendell Scott, Worth McMillion, E.J. Trivette, Henley Gray, and George Davis. There were twenty-eight American competitors and two Canadian competitors (Frog Fagan and Don Biederman). Econo Wash and Nichels Engineering were the main sponsors for the drivers.

Bobby Allison broke a tie rod coming out of turn 4 on the 131st lap. Similar to his wreck at Talladega 20 years later, Allison flipped down the front stretch, cleared a guard rail, smashed through a fence and came to rest near the scorers' table - a table at which his wife Judy was sitting. Fortunately, Bobby, Judy and others were OK.

Most of the team owners in this race were individuals rather than multi-car teams; as the case usually was with NASCAR races prior to the mid-1970s.

Richard Petty would receive ($ when considering inflation) $2,450 for winning the race while Don Biederman would be the lowest finishing driver (27th) to receive a prize bonus for $150 ($ when considering inflation). The drivers who finished 29th and 30th (last place) would not receive any prize money. Total winnings for this race would be $11,610 ($ when considering inflation).

Frog Fagan would make his official NASCAR Cup Series debut in this race. Eleven thousand fans would see a race with eleven cautions for seventy-one laps and three hundred laps were completed on a track spanning . J.P. Barthelette would serve as one of the crew chiefs in the race alongside Frankie Scott, Dale Inman and Bud Hartje. Their drivers were Dick Hutcherson, Wendell Scott, Richard Petty and James Hylton.

The transition to purpose-built racecars began in the early 1960s and occurred gradually over that decade.  Changes made to the sport by the late 1960s brought an end to the "strictly stock" vehicles of the 1950s.

Qualifying

Finishing order
Section reference: 

 Richard Petty (No. 43)
 Dick Hutcherson (No. 29)
 Paul Goldsmith (No. 99)
 Sam McQuagg* (No. 6)
 James Hylton (No. 48)
 Wendell Scott (No. 34)
 Worth McMillion (No. 83)
 E.J. Trivette (No. 19)
 Henley Gray (No. 97)
 George Davis (No. 07)
 George Poulous (No. 57)
 Elmo Langley* (No. 67)
 Bill Seifert* (No. 45)
 Wayne Smith* (No. 38)
 Johnny Steele* (No. 12)
 Earl Brooks (No. 76)
 Melvin Bradley* (No. 63)
 J.T. Putney* (No. 11)
 Bobby Allison* (No. 2)
 John Sears* (No. 4)
 Ray Hendrick* (No. 5)
 Bill Ervin* (No. 31)
 Jabe Thomas* (No. 25)
 Paul Dean Holt* (No. 01)
 Doug Cooper* (No. 02)
 Frog Fagan* (No. 75)
 Don Biederman* (No. 94)
 Neil Castles* (No. 91)
 Tom Raley* (No. 54)
 Clyde Lynn* (No. 20)

* Driver failed to finish race

Timeline
Section reference: 
 Start of race: Earl Brooks lead the other cars as they started the event.
 Lap 25: Richard Petty took over the lead from Earl Brooks.
 Lap 26: Paul Goldsmith took over the lead from Richard Petty.
 Lap 30: Neil Castles had a terminal crash.
 Lap 79: Sway bar issues managed to knock Don Biederman out of contention.
 Lap 90: Dick Hutcherson took over the lead from Paul Goldsmith.
 Lap 91: Bobby Allison took over the lead from Dick Hutcherson.
 Lap 97: Richard Petty took over the lead from Bobby Allison.
 Lap 100: Paul Dean Holt would have transmission issues with his vehicle.
 Lap 102: The frame on Jabe Thomas' vehicle would come off, causing him to leave the race for safety reasons.
 Lap 107: Ray Hendrick's engine problem would relegate him to the sidelines.
 Lap 116: Sam McQuagg took over the lead from Richard Petty.
 Lap 124: Dick Hutcherson took over the lead from Sam McQuagg.
 Lap 125: John Sears' engine developed problems, forcing him to exit the race prematurely.
 Lap 128: Bobby Allison had a terminal crash.
 Lap 138: Richard Petty took over the lead from Sam McQuagg.
 Lap 165: J.T. Putney developed problems with his vehicle's transmission.
 Lap 169: A frame came loose off Melvin Bradley's vehicle.
 Lap 197: Johnny Steele managed to blow his engine, bringing a premature end to his race.
 Lap 202: Bill Seifert managed to lose the frame of his vehicle; Wayne Smith's vehicle would suffer from a faulty transmission.
 Lap 203: An axle came loose off Elmo Langley's vehicle.
 Lap 289: Sam McQuagg lost the rear end of the vehicle, he was called off the track due to safety reasons.
 Finish: Richard Petty was official declared the winner of the event.

References

Capital City 300
Capital City 300
NASCAR races at Richmond Raceway